Selçuk Şahin may refer to:

 Selçuk Şahin (footballer, born 1981), Turkish footballer 
 Selçuk Şahin (footballer, born 1983), Turkish footballer